Beaver Creek Township is one of twelve townships in Hamilton County, Illinois, USA.  As of the 2010 census, its population was 271 and it contained 126 housing units.

Geography

Unincorporated towns
 Blairsville at 
 Bungay at 
(This list is based on USGS data and may include former settlements.)

Extinct towns
 Jefferson City at 
 New London at 
(These towns are listed as "historical" by the USGS.)

Cemeteries
The township contains Springer Cemetery.

Demographics

School districts
 Hamilton County Community Unit School District 10
 Norris City-Omaha-Enfield Community Unit School District 3

Political districts
 Illinois's 19th congressional district
 State House District 108
 State Senate District 54

References
 United States Census Bureau 2008 TIGER/Line Shapefiles
 
 United States National Atlas

External links
 Hamilton County Historical Society
 City-Data.com
 Illinois State Archives
 Township Officials of Illinois

Townships in Hamilton County, Illinois
Mount Vernon, Illinois micropolitan area
Townships in Illinois
1885 establishments in Illinois